Our Lady of Leliendaal Church  (Flemish: Onze-Lieve-Vrouw van Leliëndaal) is a Roman Catholic church in Mechelen, served by the Society of Jesus. It was designed by Lucas Faydherbe and is protected structure; described by the city council of Mechelen as one of its 8 historic churches.

History

Foundation
The original site of the church was originally owned by the Norbertine St. Michael's Abbey in Antwerp.

The architect was Lucas Faydherbe, he came from Mechelen, was the nephew of Lucas Franchoys the Younger and studied with Peter Paul Rubens in Antwerp.

In 1662, the foundation stone was laid. Construction was delayed on multiple occasions, because the façade tilted dangerously forward. Therefore, in 1664, the façade was demolished and rebuilt. In 1670, the first Mass was said and in 1674 it was solemnly inaugurated.

Napoleonic wars
In the early 19th century, during the Napoleonic wars, the church was seriously neglected and half of it was turned into a hospice for the poor of the city. The furnishings were sold and holes were made in the gables for people to be able to see out and over the church to help defend it against attack. A wall was placed in the church between the second and third windows for the establishment of an infirmary.

Re-opening
In 1834, it re-opened under the administration of the Jesuits. Through the cooperation of the nearby Minor Seminary and the Civil Hospices, it was restored and equipped with new furniture and the internal walls were removed. In 1900-1901, the Jesuits changed the floor plan and moved the choir to the gallery in the west of the church. Later in the 20th-century, a sacristy was constructed in the south west part of the church. Also, a grotto to Our Lady of Lourdes was built and new furniture was purchased.

Gallery

See also
 List of Jesuit sites in Belgium
 List of Catholic churches in Belgium
 Archdiocese of Mechelen-Brussels

References

External links
 Churches of Mechelen website

Roman Catholic churches in Belgium
Churches in Mechelen
Jesuit churches in Belgium